Nzema, also known as Nzima or Appolo, is a Central Tano language spoken by the Nzema people of southwestern Ghana and southeastern Ivory Coast. It is partially intelligible with Jwira-Pepesa and is closely related to Baoulé.

Although it is a Bia language, Nzema has had considerable influence from Akan languages, especially Twi and Fante.

Phonology

Consonants

Vowels 

Of Nzema's ten vowels, eight may be nasalized: /i᷈/, /ɪ᷈/, /ɛ̃/, /ɐ̃/, /a᷈/, /u᷈/, /ʊ᷈/, and /ɔ̃/.

Writing system

References

External links
 Nzema language dictionaries

 
Central Tano languages
Languages of Ghana
Languages of Ivory Coast